The 1984 United States Olympic trials for track and field were held at Los Angeles Memorial Coliseum in Los Angeles, California, the same venue as would host the 1984 Olympics a month and a half later. Organised by The Athletics Congress (TAC), the nine-day competition lasted from June 16 until June 24.  The national championships in track and field for the United States was a separate event that year, held a week earlier in San Jose, California.  The women's marathon Olympic trials were held on May 12 in Olympia, Washington.  The men's marathon trials were in Buffalo, New York on May 26.

The results of the event determined qualification for the United States at the 1984 Summer Olympics.

This meet had two of the closest finishes.  In the women's 100 meters hurdles, the second, third and fourth-place finishers had the same time to the 100th of a second, with winner Kim Turner just one 100th ahead.  Stephanie Hightower was the odd person out, not selected to the Olympic team.  28 years later at the 2012 trials, Hightower as President of USATF had to administer over another similar tie in the women's 100 meters between Allyson Felix and Jeneba Tarmoh that could not be separated by photo finish pictures.  The other close finish was in the men's 800 meters, where Earl Jones and Johnny Gray both received the same time of 1:43.74 to share the American Record from the same race.  And .17 behind them John Marshall and James Robinson also received the same time for the last qualifying place after Robinson kicked past the field and looked to have edged past Marshall, Robinson relaxed at the line while Marshall made one last lean to get the edge and take the final spot on the Olympic team.

1984 U.S. Olympic track and field trials results

1984 U.S. Olympic track and field trials results

Men
Key:
.

Men track events

Men field events

Women

Women track events

Women field events

References

External links
USA Track and Field

USA Outdoor Track and Field Championships
US Olympic Trials
Track, Outdoor
United States Summer Olympics Trials
Sports competitions in Los Angeles
United States Olympic Trials (track and field)
Olympic Trials (track and field)